Dr. Oscar Fernandes (27 March 1941 – 13 September 2021) was an Indian politician, a senior Indian National Congress leader and was the Union Cabinet Minister for Transport, Road and Highways and Labour and Employment, Government of India in UPA government. He was one of the closest confidants of the former Congress President Rahul Gandhi and one of the major leaders involved in the decision making process related to Congress Party.
He was closely associated with the late Mogaveera community leader Mr.Ananda Mendon and both together worked for the social upliftment of rural areas of coastal Karnataka.

Political life and career

Fernandes was the Chairman of Central Election Authority of the All India Congress Committee. He was previously the AICC General Secretary, the Minister of State (Independent charge) of the Ministry of Labour and Employment in Dr. Manmohan Singh's first UPA government in India. He served as Parliamentary Secretary to Rajiv Gandhi.

He was elected to the 7th Lok Sabha in 1980 from Udupi constituency in Karnataka. He was re-elected to the Lok Sabha in 1984, 1989, 1991 and 1996 from the same constituency. Later, he was elected to the Rajya Sabha in 1998. He was re-elected to the Rajya Sabha in 2004. He was a Union Minister from 2004 to 2009, holding a number of portfolios such as Statistics and Programme Implementation, NRI Affairs, Youth and Sports Affairs and Labour and Employment. He served two terms as a member of the Council of the Indian Institute of Science, Bangalore.

Name of Oscar Fernandes is also figured  in the National Harold case.

Personal life

Oscar was born to Roque Fernandes, the head of Government Composite PU College and the first President of Manipal Institute of Technology and Leonissa M. Fernandes, the first female magistrate in India, at the family estate at Udupi. Fernandes was one of 12 children in his family, and grew up with a strong Catholic background. As a child he was an altar boy, and as a youth he was active in Church activities. His family belongs to the Fernandes-Prabhu clan, a Mangalorean Catholic clan from Udyavara in Udupi district. He married Blossom Mathias Prabhu on 26 August 1981 and had one son Oshan and one daughter Oshanie. His son Oshan is married to Frazil Quadros and Oscar's daughter Oshanie is married to Mark Saldanha. In 2002 Fernandes inaugurated the Glowinstar Academy, an integrated development school, in Ambalpady, dedicated to his father, Roque.

Death
Fernandes died on 13 September 2021 at the age of 80, due to age related ailments at Yenepoya hospital in Mangalore. He was undergoing treatment there since 19 July, following a clot in brain due to a fall at his home.

Citations

References

.

External links
 Detailed Profile: Oscar Fernandes in India.gov.in website
Official biographical sketch in Parliament of India website

1941 births
2021 deaths
Indian National Congress politicians from Karnataka
Members of the Cabinet of India
Mangaloreans
People from Udupi
India MPs 1980–1984
India MPs 1984–1989
India MPs 1989–1991
India MPs 1991–1996
India MPs 1996–1997
Rajya Sabha members from Karnataka
Lok Sabha members from Karnataka
Karnataka municipal councillors
People from Chitradurga
Labour ministers of India